The M4 is a north–south metropolitan route in the eThekwini Metropolitan Municipality and partially in the KwaDukuza Local Municipality, South Africa. It runs from the N2 at the defunct Durban International Airport to Ballito via the Durban Central Business District (CBD) and uMhlanga. The sections between the airport and the southern edge of the CBD, and between the northern edge of the CBD and the exit to uMhlanga are classified as freeway. On the section from the southern edge of the CBD (where the freeway ends) to the Bram Fischer Street/Soldier's Way junction, the M4 is cosigned with the R102.

Route 
The M4 begins at an interchange with the N2 Highway (Durban Outer Ring Road) and the R102 Road adjacent to the old Durban International Airport & AFB Durban (just east of Umlazi). It begins by going north-north-east for 12 kilometres as the Inkosi Albert Luthuli Highway, parallel to the R102, to reach the Durban Central Business District near the Port of Durban, where it stops being a highway and makes a left and a right turn to join the R102 and be co-signed with it through the city centre.

While co-signed with the R102, it is Julius Nyerere Street northwards and Market Street southwards (one-way streets). Just after passing under the N3 Highway in the CBD, the M4/R102 turn eastwards and become Johannes Nkosi Street eastwards and David Webster Street westwards (one-way streets).

At the Umgeni Road junction, the R102 becomes Umgeni Road northwards while the M4 remains facing eastwards (still one-way streets). Just after meeting the M12 by the Kingsmead Stadium, the M4 turns northwards to become Stalwart Simelane Street. It goes northwards for 40 kilometres, becoming Ruth First Highway, bypassing the Moses Mabhida Stadium and passing through Durban North (where Virginia Airport is located) before leaving the city of Durban. It then passes through uMhlanga Rocks, Tongaat Beach and Westbrook as the Leo Boyd Highway. After Westbrook, it exits the eThekwini Metropolitan Municipality and reaches Ballito, where it makes a left turn onto Ballito Drive and meets the N2 Highway again. It ends shortly thereafter at another junction with the R102 near Compensation.

Incidents

2022 KwaZulu-Natal flood damage 
The section of the M4 in La Mercy, where it crosses the Mdloti River, was damaged by the 2022 KwaZulu-Natal floods. The South African National Defence Force helped in the rebuilding of the bridge. The bridge was reopened on 10 July 2022.

The section of the M4 by Tongaat Beach (Boys Town) was also washed away by the 2022 KwaZulu-Natal floods. It was reopened on 26 August 2022.

The section of the M4 crossing the Tongaat River was also damaged by the floods. As of 30 November 2022, no progress has been made to repair the road by the National Roads Agency. Repairs are expected to start in 2023.

References

External links
 eThekwini Online - Roads Home Page

Highways in South Africa
Metropolitan Routes in Durban